Tyler Volk is a professor in the departments of environmental studies and biology at New York University.

His areas of interest include principles of form and function in systems (described as metapatterns), environmental challenges to global prosperity,  CO2 and global change, biosphere theory and the role of life in earth dynamics.

Books
Tyler Volk has authored seven books, most recently, Quarks to Culture: How We Came to Be

Quarks to Culture explores the rhythm within what Tyler Volk calls the "grand sequence," a series of levels of sizes and innovations building from elementary quanta to globalized human civilization. The key is "combogenesis," the building-up from combination and integration to produce new things with innovative relations. Themes unfold in how physics and chemistry led to biological evolution, and biological evolution to cultural evolution. Volk develops an inclusive natural philosophy that brings clarity to our place in the world, a roadmap for our minds." Quarks to Culture was reviewed in Science in January 2018.

His previous books include: CO2 Rising: The World’s Greatest Environmental Challenge, What is Death?: A Scientist Looks at the Cycle of Life, Gaia's Body: Toward a Physiology of Earth, and Metapatterns: Across Space, Time, and Mind.

Environmental studies and teaching
With Dale Jamieson, Christopher Schlottmann, and others, Volk helped plan and develop the interdisciplinary Environmental Studies Program launched at New York University in Fall 2007. In Fall 2014, Environmental Studies became a department in NYU’s Faculty of Arts and Science. Volk was awarded NYU’s “Golden Dozen” teaching award for academic years 2003-2004 and 2007-2008. In academic year 2008-2009 Volk received an all-university Distinguished Teaching Award.

Biosphere science
Volk works toward knowledge about life on a global scale; past, present, and future. His collaborative research contributed to understanding the biosphere, with "biosphere" defined as the integrated system of atmosphere, ocean, soil, and life. 
Volk's modeling of the global carbon cycle quantified biological versus physical-chemical impacts on the distribution of carbon and other elements in world's oceans.

Throughout deep time, biological evolution has been as important as purely physical forcings in shaping Earth's thermal and chemical states. For instance, the evolution of plankton with shells of calcium carbonate increased the steady-state level of atmospheric CO2 and therefore pushed Earth's climate toward additional greenhouse warmth. The evolution of flowering plants (angiosperms) had the opposite effect, cooling the Earth by enhancing chemical weathering rates on the continents and thereby lowering the steady-state levels of CO2.

Volk's work with colleague David Schwartzman showed that an overall “biotic enhancement of weathering,” including activities by ancient bacterial mats and crusts, cooled the Earth by 30 or more degrees C (best estimates) relative to the baseline of an abiotic Earth. Without an initial downward forcing of global temperature by the microbes, certain proteins would not have had enough stability for higher forms of life to evolve, such as plants.

At the American Geophysical Union's Chapman Conference on the Gaia Hypothesis (Valencia, Spain, 2000), Volk served on the program committee and presented,  “The future of Gaia theory: How to build a lively biosphere.” Clarifying a distinctive version of the Gaia-biosphere, Volk introduced concepts such as “biochemical guilds,” by-products, and “cycling ratios” across several works. He debated terms such as “regulation” and issues about the structure of “Gaia” with James Lovelock, Tim Lenton, and David Wilkinson. Volk also publicly debated Axel Kleidon on the role of entropy in the biosphere.

NASA advanced life support
Working for NASA on futuristic space projects, Volk built math models for the cycling of elements in what were called "closed ecological life support systems" (CELSS). From 1986-1998, he was active in this research subfield of advanced life support, helping NASA plan the systems that might someday keep astronauts alive on the Moon and Mars. With colleague John Rummel, he developed some of the first computer models to connect the flows and chemical transformations of crop production, human metabolism, and waste processing. Volk then turned attention to the modeling of crop growth and development for enhanced productivity, collaborating with experimentalists at Utah State University and at NASA centers in Florida, Texas, and California, in particular publishing with crop physiologists Bruce Bugbee of Utah State University and Raymond Wheeler of Kennedy Space Center, as well as with his Ph.D. students Francesco Tubiello and James Cavazonni.

References

External links
Department of Environmental Studies, New York University, Faculty
Department of Biology, New York University, Faculty
New York University Faculty of Arts and Science
Metapatterns: The Pattern Underground (personal page with links to papers)
The Amygdaloids, lead guitarist with Joseph LeDoux
Barry Wood. A multidisciplinary tour of cosmic history charts the “grand sequence” of existence Science Magazine, January 16, 2018.
Robert Wright (journalist). video and podcast interview, on “Quarks to Culture,”, September 28, 2017 
John Horgan. 2017 interview “How Quarks Turned into Cultures”, Scientific American, June 7, 2017.
2010 Big Think, Why Life Needs Death
Carl Zimmer. Video interview/conversation on CO2 Rising, Bloggingheads.tv, November 23, 2008.
Jill Neimark. A Conversation: With Tyler Volk; Using Flows and Fluxes to Demythologize the Unity of Life. New York Times, August 11, 1998. Accessed October 8, 2008.
Fred Pearce. Review: The global symphony. New Scientist, January 17, 1998. Accessed October 8, 2008.

21st-century American biologists
Living people
Year of birth missing (living people)